= Vanasthalipuram Lutheran Church =

Vanasthalipuram Lutheran Church is a Lutheran Church located in Hyderabad, India.

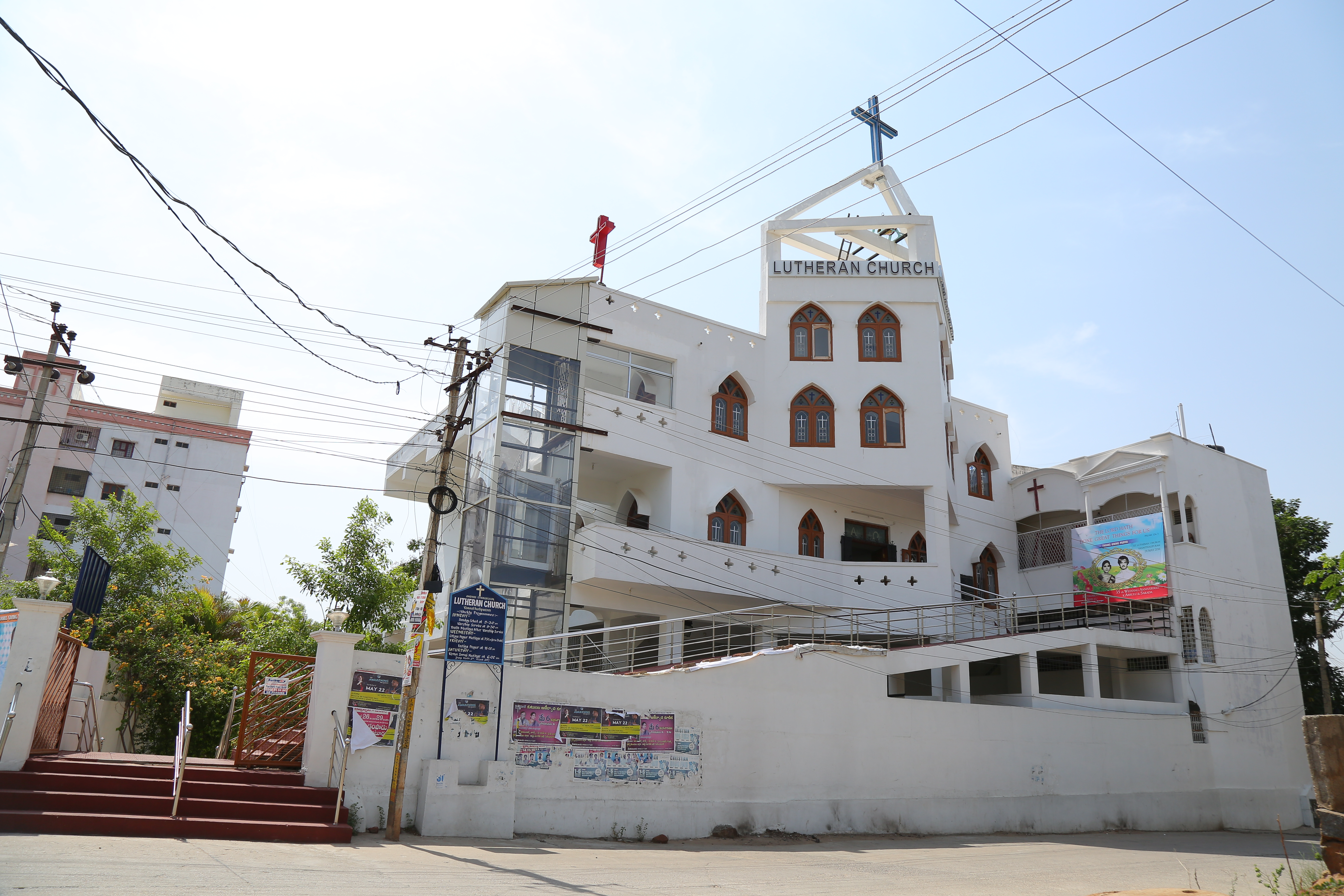

== History ==
Before 1984, Lutheran families living in the Vanasthalipuram area attended the Lutheran church at Lakdikapool. At that time, Peter and Nanda Koteshwar Rao requested Reverend Lam Charles to start Sunday worship services at Vanasthalipuram. The families of Bandela Moses, K Abraham Lincoln, Balla Ratana Raju, Rapaka Ratana Kumar, B.A. Willington, E.D. Livingston, Peter, Koteshwar Rao, assembled in a private school with the name Pinky Flavour. The first worship was held on 7 October 1984. The school is now underground, rendering it impossible to get to.

The church faced many problems in its initial efforts to continue church services that P Raja Mohan Roy and B John Babu took over and helped to continue Sunday services and other festivals. Rev. Dr. M. Victorpal (ACTC Professor) established and lead the church. Professors from ACTC Rev. S.V.Lutherpal, Rev. B.C. Paul, Rev. Sampurna Rao, Rev. Yesupadam, Rev. David Raj, attended to run all kind of worship.

Smt. B. Lilly Willington used to run Sunday school regularly, and was known for making special efforts to make female churchgoers more pious. When the school was moved, services continued in the house of T Yesuspadam for the next four years.

Construction of the present church was completed in 1993. The church was ceremonially opened for use in a service led by Rev. B.C Pal, Synod president, and Rev. C.H Yohan. Until it is elevated to the status of "B" Class Parish by the AELC Guntur, Lutheran church Lakdikapool continued to pay the pastor's salary.

The project had an estimated budget of over Rs.45, and was completed in its entirety in November 2007. The formal inauguration ceremony for the church was led by Dr.V.E Christopher and Rev. Elea. At that time the parish pastor was Rev. Prasanna Kumar. Every year, church anniversary celebrations take place on 6 and 7 October.
